The date and program of the first interracial kiss on television is a much debated topic. In many parts of the world social stigma and legislation (such as anti-miscegenation laws) have hindered relations between people from different groups (races). The first kiss on television has been discussed in the context of this social stigma. As there is no agreement on what constitutes a race there is also no general agreement on when the first interracial kiss occurred and a number of claims exist.

Some states, such as the United States and the United Kingdom have questions related to ethnicity and race in their censuses (covered in the articles race and ethnicity in the United States census and classification of ethnicity in the United Kingdom). In both cases the census is based on self-definition. The available options differ substantially between the countries and have developed over time (i.e. two people might be considered to be of the same race in one census, but not in another).

Claims

US television

The Ed Sullivan Show (1958)
In The Ed Sullivan Show S12, E10 aired 16 November 1958, William Shatner, a Canadian of European ancestry, kisses France Nuyen, originally from France, of Asian ancestry. This was during a scene from the then current Broadway production of The World of Suzie Wong.

Sea Hunt (1959)
In the Sea Hunt episode "Proof of Guilt" aired 16 August 1959, Lloyd Bridges and Nobu McCarthy (née Atsumi) shared a kiss near the end of the episode.

Adventures in Paradise (1960)
An episode of Adventures in Paradise titled "The Big Surf", broadcast in 1960, featured two scripted kisses: one between actress Pilar Seurat and actor Robert Sampson, and another with Seurat and Gardner McKay.

I Spy (1966)
An episode of I Spy titled "The Tiger", broadcast on January 5, 1966, featured a scripted interracial kiss between Eurasian actress France Nuyen and Robert Culp.

Star Trek: "What Are Little Girls Made Of" - Uhura and Chapel (1966)

Episode eight of Star Trek's first season included a friendly kiss between African character Nyota Uhura (played by African American Nichelle Nichols) and Nurse Chapel (played by White actress Majel Barrett).

Star Trek: "Mirror, Mirror" – Kirk and Marlena (1967)
Episode four of season two, "Mirror, Mirror", which originally aired on October 6, 1967, featured a kiss between Eurasian actress Barbara Luna and William Shatner, a Canadian of European ancestry.

Movin' with Nancy (1967)
A December 1967 TV special, Movin' with Nancy, featured a kiss between Nancy Sinatra and Sammy Davis, Jr. Sinatra kissed Davis on the cheek.

Star Trek: "Plato's Stepchildren" – Kirk and Uhura (1968)

A 1968 episode of Star Trek, "Plato's Stepchildren", which first aired on November 22, 1968, is often referred to as the first interracial kiss on television.

As noted above, there had been earlier interracial kisses not only on television, but on Star Trek itself.

Furthermore, William Shatner claims that his lips did not touch those of Nichelle Nichols. However, she asserted that the kiss was real.

UK television

Unlike the situation in the United States, interracial kisses in UK films and television shows have attracted little comment.

The 1954 British-New Zealand film The Seekers featured an interracial kiss between a European  (played by Jack Hawkins) and a Maori (played by Javanese-German Laya Raki). This film was later screened on television in the US (under the title Land of Fury) and the UK, but the original screening dates are unknown.

For a time, the first was understood to have occurred during an episode of the British soap opera Emergency – Ward 10 in 1964. However, in November 2015, a Granada Play of the Week, You in Your Small Corner, was uncovered which was broadcast in June 1962; that quickly led to the rediscovery of another play featuring the same young Jamaican actor, Hot Summer Night, televised in Britain on 1 February 1959.

Hot Summer Night (1959)
Lloyd Reckord and Andrée Melly appeared in the ITV Armchair Theatre adaptation of Ted Willis's play Hot Summer Night, broadcast on 1 February 1959. British Film Institute panel moderator Samira Ahmed was able in 2015 to announce the rediscovery of this TV kiss. and later adapted as the 1961 feature film Flame in the Streets.

You in Your Small Corner (1962)

In June 1962, a live performance of the play You in Your Small Corner by Barry Reckord was broadcast on British television as part of the Granada Television series Play of the Week. The central theme of the play is a relationship between a young black intellectual and a white working-class girl. During the play, a kiss takes place between actors Lloyd Reckord and Elizabeth MacLennan, and what has been described as an "explicit post-coital scene".

You In Your Small Corner was rediscovered during preparations for a November 2015 British Film Institute panel discussion on "Race and Romance on TV" and was used in publicity for the event.

Emergency Ward 10

One of the earliest interracial kisses on television occurred in a July 1964 episode of British soap opera Emergency Ward 10, during which characters Louise Mahler (portrayed by Joan Hooley) and Giles Farmer (portrayed by John White) kissed. The scene in which Mahler and Farmer kissed was originally scripted to occur in Mahler's bedroom, but was rewritten so as to occur outdoors, due to concerns it would otherwise be too risqué (the earlier Lloyd Reckord plays had both been shown well after the 9pm adult-content watershed). According to an issue of the Daily Express published after the episode aired, "not a viewer rang-up to complain". In a 2015 interview, conducted prior to the discovery of the You in Your Small Corner footage, Hooley noted that the historic importance of what had been known as the "first interracial kiss on television" had been inflated in popular memory:

Netherlands television

(1959)

The comedy TV show  (1957-1959) is considered as the first TV series on Dutch television. Broadcast on 5 January 1959, in the episode , Afro-American actor Donald Jones sings a song, to Dutch actress Roeki Aronds. After the song Jones kisses Aronds. At the time the kiss was not controversial and did not get much attention, but the song became a standard in Dutch music. Donald Jones, an actor, dancer and singer from New York, was one of the first black stars in Dutch show business.

References

External links
 Clip of Hot Summer Night kiss (1959)
 Clip of Sea Hunt kiss (1959)
 Clip of You in Your Small Corner kiss (1962)
 Clip of Emergency Ward 10 showing what was previously thought to be the first interracial kiss on television (1964)
Nichelle Nichols on filming the first interracial kiss on American television (video interview)

History of television
Kissing
Fiction about interracial romance